Signed, sealed, and delivered is a linguistic Siamese triplet and may refer to:
 A deed of property and its legal framework

It may also refer to:
 "Signed Sealed and Delivered", a 1948 song by Cowboy Copas later covered by James Brown
 Signed, Sealed & Delivered, a 1970 album by Stevie Wonder
 "Signed, Sealed, Delivered I'm Yours", a 1970 song from the Stevie Wonder album
 Signed Sealed Delivered (album), a 2010 album by Craig David
 Signed, Sealed, Delivered (TV series), an American television series airing on the Hallmark Channel
 Signed, Sealed & Delivered (mixtape), a 2011 mixtape by K. Michelle